The Standards, Productivity and Innovation Board (abbreviation: SPRING Singapore) was a statutory board under the Ministry of Trade and Industry of the Singapore Government. It worked as an agency for enterprise development, and helped enterprises to enhance the competitiveness in Singapore market. It was also the national standards and conformance body.

On 1 April 2018, SPRING Singapore was merged with IE Singapore to form Enterprise Singapore.

History 
Formerly known as Productivity and Standards Board (PSB), it was formed from the merger between the National Productivity Board (NPB) and the Singapore Institute of Standards and Industrial Research (SISIR) in April 1996. It helped to bring together the soft skills of productivity handled by NPB and the technical aspects handled by SISIR.

In April 2002, the organization was renamed SPRING Singapore and shifted towards an innovation-driven economy, and its new role in promoting creativity to sustain growth for Singaporeans.

Mission 
As the national standards and conformance body, SPRING Singapore 'helped to lower technical barriers to trade, provide quality assurance for products and services and promote industry use of Singapore and international standards'.

SPRING Singapore's mission was "to help Singapore enterprises grow and build trust in Singapore products and services".

Organisation 
SPRING Singapore was headed by Philip Yeo, former head of A*STAR.

SPRING Singapore was divided into five departments:
Enterprise Capabilities
Enterprise Promotion
Industry Development
Quality & Standards
Corporate Development

Portfolio 
The agency had three areas of focus: productivity and innovation; standards and quality; and small and medium-sized enterprises (SMEs) and the domestic sector.

Scholarships 
In 2008, SPRING Singapore awarded their first batch of Executive Development Scholarships (EDS) to focused junior college and university students with business and entrepreneurship goals.

The Management Development Scholarship (MDS) was also available to employees of SMEs who wish to pursue their Masters with a university on SPRING Singapore's list. Up to 90% of the course fees was subsidised by SPRING Singapore, with the remaining 10% fully borne by the SME company. This scholarship came with a bond of up to two years with the sponsoring SME company.

See also 
 Ministry of Trade and Industry
 Government of Singapore
 Economy of Singapore

References 

Productivity organizations
Government agencies established in 2002
2002 establishments in Singapore
2018 disestablishments in Singapore